Saxidomus nuttalli is a species of large edible saltwater clam, a marine bivalve mollusk in the family Veneridae, the venus clams. Common names include California butterclam and Washington clam.

This clam is native to the west coast of North America, its distribution extending from northern California to Baja California.

This is a commercially exploited species that attains a length of approximately 15 cm.

Archaeology
This species was harvested by Chumash peoples on the central California coast, at least as early as the Millingstone Horizon. The shells were used as currency by local native peoples.

See also
 Intertidal zone

Line notes

References
 Intertidal Marine Invertebrates of the South Puget Sound (2008) 
 C.Michael Hogan (2008) Morro Creek, The Megaltihic Portal, editor Andy Burnham 

Clams
nuttalli
Marine molluscs of North America
Molluscs of the Pacific Ocean
Molluscs of the United States
Western North American coastal fauna
Fauna of California
Fauna of the Baja California Peninsula
Seafood in Native American cuisine
Chumash
Commercial molluscs
Bivalves described in 1788